is one of the countries said to have existed in the Japanese archipelago in the 3rd century.

It is listed in the Wajinden and the ruling official is called a 

According to "Records of Three Kingdoms," Toumakoku was located 20 days by water to the south from Fumi (in Umi, Kasuya District) or Sueranokuni (Karatsu City, Saga Prefecture).

Hata District (central-western part of the Korean Peninsula)).

It may have been the leading power of the Wakoku.

References

See Also 

 Wajinden
 Book of Liang
 History of the Northern Dynasties
History of the Kyushu region
Former countries in Japanese history
Wajinden
States of the Wajinden
Pages with unreviewed translations